Cheng Yung-chin (born 8 October 1949) is a Taiwanese politician.

Personal life and education
Cheng is of Hakka descent, and is married to Song Li-hua. His brother is Cheng Yung-tang.

He attended Chinese Culture University for graduate study in politics.

Political career
Chen was the deputy speaker of the Hsinchu County Council from 1986 to 1994. The next year Cheng won a seat in the Legislative Yuan. He faced Lin Kuang-hua for the first time in the Hsinchu County magistracy election of 1997. Cheng lost a contentious campaign, but managed to win reelection to the legislature in 1998. Shortly after the 1999 Jiji earthquake, Cheng supported the visit of Trinley Thaye Dorje, a Tibetan Buddhist leader, to Taiwan. For a portion of his tenure in the legislature, Cheng served as Kuomintang caucus whip. Cheng did not complete his second legislative term, as he was nominated the KMT candidate for the magistracy of Hsinchu County. Subsequently, Cheng defeated Lin twice, serving as Hsinchu County Magistrate from 2001 to 2009. In August 2006, the Hsinchu District Prosecutor's Office indicted Cheng on charges of bribery and corruption. In light of the legal proceedings, his Kuomintang membership was suspended. Cheng supported Chang Pi-chin, a former KMT member running an independent campaign for Hsinchu County Magistrate, in 2009. As a result, Cheng's own
party membership was revoked.

Cheng declared his independent candidacy for the 2014 Hsinchu County magistracy election, but lost despite the support of former rival Lin Kuang-hua and the Democratic Progressive Party.

The next year, Chen launched an independent legislative bid for Hsinchu County Constituency, supported by the DPP and the Hsinchu County Cheng family political faction. However, Cheng lost to Lin Wei-chou.

References

1949 births
Living people
Hsinchu County Members of the Legislative Yuan
Members of the 3rd Legislative Yuan
Members of the 4th Legislative Yuan
Kuomintang Members of the Legislative Yuan in Taiwan
Expelled members of the Kuomintang
Magistrates of Hsinchu County
Taiwanese politicians of Hakka descent
Chinese Culture University alumni